John Peterson Saunders (February 2, 1955 – August 10, 2016) was a Canadian-American sports journalist. He worked for ESPN and ABC from 1986 until his death in 2016.

Early life and career
Saunders attended high school in Châteauguay. Saunders was an all-star defenseman in the Montreal junior leagues, received a scholarship and played hockey at Western Michigan University from 1974 to 1976 with his brother, Bernie.  He transferred to Ryerson University in Toronto and played for the Rams from 1976 to 1978. After the 1977–78 season, Saunders was named to the Ontario University Athletic Association All-Star team.

He was the news director for CKNS Radio (Espanola, Ontario, 1978), and sports anchor at CKNY-TV (North Bay, Ontario, 1978–1979) and at ATV News (New Brunswick, 1979–1980). He also served as the main sports anchor for CITY-TV (Toronto, 1980–1982). He then moved to the United States to work as a sports anchor at WMAR-TV (Baltimore, 1982–1986).

Career at ESPN and ABC Sports
Saunders joined ESPN in 1986 and was the host of ESPN's The Sports Reporters, starting with the illness and subsequent death of Dick Schaap in September 2001. He previously co-hosted NFL Primetime from 1987 to 1989. He was also the secondary studio host for the network's NHL broadcasts from 1986–87 to 1988, filling-in for lead host Tom Mees when needed. He became the lead studio host from 1992–93 until 2004 and NHL on ABC from 1992 to 1994 and again from 2000 to 2004 and hosted College Football on ABC from 1992 to 2015. He has also hosted ABC's coverage of baseball under the Baseball Night in America banner and was involved in ESPN's coverage earlier in his career. He also anchored the 1995 World Series for ABC.

Saunders' memoir, Playing Hurt: My Journey from Despair to Hope, which spans his three-decade career at ESPN and ABC, was published posthumously in 2017.

NBA
From 2002 to 2004, and occasionally during the 2007 season, Saunders did play-by-play for ESPN's coverage of the NBA, mostly on Sunday nights. He was the studio host of ESPN's NBA Shootaround from 2004 to 2006.

Saunders also served as a back-up play-by-play man for NBA on ABC. He called most of the Team U.S.A. games on ESPN for the 2007 FIBA Americas Championship.

SportsCenter
In 2008, he began hosting the 7pm ET Sunday SportsCenter during the NFL season with Chris Berman and analyst Tom Jackson.

Toronto Raptors
He was the television play-by-play announcer for the Toronto Raptors from 1995 to 2001, eventually being replaced by Chuck Swirsky.

Personal life
John was an advocate for juvenile diabetes research, having been diagnosed with Type 1 diabetes as an adult in the early 1980s after his then-girlfriend dragged him to the hospital to get tested. He was also a founding board member of the Jimmy V Foundation for cancer research, a charity that has raised $200 million with 100% of the proceeds funding cancer research. Saunders lived in Hastings-on-Hudson, New York, with his wife and children. He was the brother of former National Hockey League player Bernie Saunders.

Death
On August 10, 2016, Saunders's wife discovered him not breathing in their New York home. Emergency responders rushed to the scene, but around 4 a.m., he was pronounced dead. He was 61 years of age.  Foul play was ruled out by authorities. Family members stated Saunders had not been feeling well in the days leading up to his death but no specific cause of death was publicly announced.

John U. Bacon, who coauthored Saunders's autobiography, stated in the book that the coroner found that Saunders died from a combination of an enlarged heart, complications from his diabetes, and dysautonomia, which affects the nervous system which regulates breathing, blood pressure and heart rate. Saunders's brain was donated to Mount Sinai School of Medicine for research as requested. He was included in the "in memoriam" segment at the 2017 ESPY Awards.

References

Further reading

External links
John Saunders' ESPN Bio

1955 births
2016 deaths
Black Canadian broadcasters
Black Canadian ice hockey players
Canadian expatriate sportspeople in the United States
Canadian male journalists
Canadian television sportscasters
College basketball announcers in the United States
College football announcers
Major League Baseball broadcasters
National Basketball Association broadcasters
National Hockey League broadcasters
People from Ajax, Ontario
Toronto Metropolitan University alumni
Sportspeople from Toronto
Women's National Basketball Association announcers
NBA G League broadcasters
Toronto Raptors announcers
Western Michigan Broncos men's ice hockey players
Wide World of Sports (American TV series)
People from Hastings-on-Hudson, New York
Citytv people